Kennedy is an unincorporated community in Lake County, Illinois, United States.

Notes

Unincorporated communities in Lake County, Illinois
Unincorporated communities in Illinois